David Alan Petherbridge  (10 September 1927 – 30 July 2020) was a British Olympic athlete. He competed in the 1964 Olympic Games in Tokyo.

Petherbridge was appointed a Member of the Order of the British Empire (MBE) in the 1997 Birthday Honours for services to judo. In September 2010 he was inducted to the Welsh Sports Hall of Fame.

References

External links 
Alan Petherbridge's profile at the British Olympic Association
Alan Petherbridge's profile at Sports Reference.com
Alan Petherbridge ThisIsSouthWales 23-10-08

1927 births
2020 deaths
Welsh male judoka
Sportspeople from Swansea
Judoka at the 1964 Summer Olympics
Olympic judoka of Great Britain
Members of the Order of the British Empire